William Wood is an American screenwriter. Along with Mel Goldberg, He wrote for the 1964 film The Lively Set, starring James Darren, Pamela Tiffin, Doug McClure and Joanie Summers. He also wrote for television programs including Mission: Impossible, Cimarron City, Room 222, Here Come the Brides, Ben Casey, The Fugitive, The Mod Squad, Dan August and The Greatest Show on Earth.

References

External links 

Possibly living people
Place of birth missing (living people)
Year of birth missing (living people)
American male screenwriters
American television writers
American male television writers
20th-century American screenwriters